Trévillach is a commune in the Pyrénées-Orientales department in southern France.

Geography

Localisation 
Trévillach is located in the canton of La Vallée de l'Agly and in the arrondissement of Prades.

Population and society

Demography

Events 
 Patronal feast : 11 November.
 Communal feast : 22 August.

See also
 Communes of the Pyrénées-Orientales department

References

External links

 

Communes of Pyrénées-Orientales
Fenouillèdes